Central German or Middle German is a group of High German dialects spoken from the Rhineland in the west to the former eastern territories of Germany.

Central German divides into two subgroups, West Central German and East Central German.

Central German is distinguished by having experienced the High German consonant shift to a lesser degree than Upper German. It is spoken in the linguistic transition region separated from Northern Germany (Low German/Low Franconian) by the Benrath line isogloss and separated from Southern Germany (Upper German) by the Speyer line.

Central German is spoken in large and influential German cities like the capital Berlin, the former West German capital Bonn, Cologne, Düsseldorf, Leipzig, Dresden and the main German financial center Frankfurt.

The area corresponds to the geological region of the hilly Central Uplands that stretches from the North German plain to the South German Scarplands, covering the states of Saarland, Rhineland-Palatinate, Hesse, Thuringia and Saxony.

The East Central dialects are the closest to Standard German (chiefly as a written language) among other German dialects. Modern Standard German thus evolved from the vocabulary and spelling of this region, with some pronunciation features from East Franconian German.

Classification
 West Central German, part of the Franconian language group
 Central Franconian
 Ripuarian
 Moselle Franconian
 Luxembourgish
 Rhine Franconian
 Palatinate German
 Lorraine Franconian, spoken in Lorraine
 Hessian
 North Hessian
 East Hessian
 Central Hessian
 South Hessian
 East Central German
 Thuringian
 Upper Saxon
 
 North Upper Saxon
 Lusatian
 East Central German dialects spoken in the former eastern territories:
 Silesian, nearly extinct
 High Prussian, nearly extinct

See also

 High German
 Upper German
 Low German

Notes

Central German languages
German dialects